Keith Anthony Newman (born January 19, 1977) is a former American football linebacker. He played college football at  University of North Carolina at Chapel Hill (UNC, UNC-Chapel Hill, North Carolina, Chapel Hill)  and was drafted by the Buffalo Bills in the fourth round of the 1999 NFL Draft.

Newman was also a member of the Atlanta Falcons, Minnesota Vikings and Miami Dolphins.

College years
Newman attended the University of North Carolina and was a four-year letterman in football. In football, as a senior, he posted four sacks, 132 tackles, and an interception, and was a second-team All-Atlantic Coast Conference selection.

High school years
Newman lettered for three seasons at Thomas Jefferson High School in Tampa, Florida.

Newman won the Guy Toph Award as a senior in 1994. He was the 55th winner of the award which is given to the top high school football player in Hillsborough County.

Newman caught 62 passes for 1,538 yards and 13 touchdowns while at Jefferson.

References

1977 births
American football outside linebackers
Atlanta Falcons players
Buffalo Bills players
Living people
Miami Dolphins players
Minnesota Vikings players
North Carolina Tar Heels football players
Players of American football from Tampa, Florida
Thomas Jefferson High School (Tampa, Florida) alumni